Toquima National Forest was established by the U.S. Forest Service in Nevada on April 15, 1907 with . On July 1, 1908 the entire forest was transferred to Toiyabe National Forest and the name was discontinued.

References

External links
Forest History Society
Forest History Society:Listing of the National Forests of the United States Text from Davis, Richard C., ed. Encyclopedia of American Forest and Conservation History. New York: Macmillan Publishing Company for the Forest History Society, 1983. Vol. II, pp. 743-788.

Former National Forests of Nevada